John William Davis was a footballer who played as a forward for Port Vale and Macclesfield in the 1920s.

Career
Davis played for Bredbury United, before joining Second Division side Port Vale as an amateur in January 1920. His single appearance came at inside-right in a goalless draw with Fulham at The Old Recreation Ground on 16 April 1921. He was released, probably in 1922, and moved on to Macclesfield.

Career statistics
Source:

References

English footballers
Association football forwards
Port Vale F.C. players
Macclesfield Town F.C. players
English Football League players
Year of birth missing
Year of death missing